Mr. Jingles is a 2006 American slasher film directed by Tommy Brunswick and written by Todd Brunswick. It was followed by a 2009 reboot titled Jingles the Clown.

Plot
Young Angie Randall witnesses a spree killing clown named Mr. Jingles murder her parents, before he is shot to death by Officers Baines and Guinness. Before dying, Jingles tells Angie, "I'll be back for you!" The traumatized Angie is institutionalized until she is a teenager, at which point she is released into the care of her aunt Helen Jameson, and cousins Dylan and Heidi.

At the local cemetery, a visitor is killed by someone dressed as Jingles. Baines (who is now mayor) and Guinness are called to the graveyard by the man who found the body. The stranger tells them this is just the beginning, and reveals he knows that Baines and the police force (excluding Guinness) covered up the fact that Jingles was wrongly lynched and imprisoned when Angie's father and several others thought he tried to abduct Angie at her 4th birthday party, when in reality he had saved her from an actual child predator. After the three men leave, two of Dylan's delinquent friends are slain by Jingles while trying to steal his tombstone for a prank that they, Guinness' daughter Melanie, and a reluctant Dylan intend to play on Angie at a birthday party Heidi is setting up for her.

In his home, the stranger tells Guinness that he believes it is not a copycat, that Jingles has actually come back from the dead. The stranger (who reveals he was once employed at the penitentiary where Jingles was placed and witnessed the tortures inflicted on Jingles that drove him mad) presents occult objects that he found in Jingles' prison cell as evidence, prompting Guinness to remember that Jingles did chant something in a strange language as he lay dying. The two grab the items necessary to banish Jingles, who confronts them as they go to leave, killing the stranger, and wounding Guinness.

While Angie, Heidi, and Heidi's friends are partying in the Jameson house, Melanie dresses up like Jingles with the intent of crashing the celebration, only to be axed by the real Jingles. Jingles breaks in and kills Heidi, Dylan, and the rest of the revelers, leaving only Angie. An unknown amount of time later, Baines and two police officers enter the house, and find an hysterical Angie clutching Jingles' axes, making it appear as if she is the murderer. As she is being hauled away by a police officer, Angie is saved by Guinness, while Jingles attacks Baines and another officer.

Cast
Karen Turner as Mrs. Randall
Marc Galisteo as James Randall
Roger E  as David R. Ness/Mr. Jingles
Leila Padme as Angie Randall
Chris Peters as Bill Guinness
Tom Reeser as Mayor Baines
Jon Manthei as Doctor Rudolph/Cop 1
Israa Taiebi as Helen Jameson
Chrissy Reeser as Mayor's Assistant
Doug Kolbicz as Chris
Nathanial Ketchum as Dylan Jameson
Heather Doba as Melanie Guinness
Brian Zoner as Curtis
Jessica Hall as Heidi Jameson

Release
The film was released on DVD by Live/Artisan on July 18, 2006.

Reception

Mr. Jingles received predominantly negative reviews upon its release, with many criticizing the acting, script, and poor production values.
Scott Weinberg from DVD Talk gave the film one out of five stars, calling it "worthless", and further stated that every aspect of the film was poorly executed. Dread Central rated the film an abysmal score of zero out of five, offering similar criticism towards its poor execution, calling it "one of the worst direct-to-DVD horror films of all time".

References

External links

2006 films
American slasher films
2000s teen horror films
Fictional clowns
2006 horror films
Films set in 1997
Films set in 2004
American films about revenge
Films set in Michigan
Films shot in Michigan
2006 comedy horror films
American supernatural horror films
American independent films
American teen horror films
American comedy horror films
Direct-to-video horror films
Films directed by Tommy Brunswick
Horror films about clowns
2006 comedy films
2000s English-language films
2000s American films